José Javier Villacaña Jiménez is a Mexican politician affiliated with the Institutional Revolutionary Party. He is the incumbent Mayor of Oaxaca de Juárez. As of 2014 he served as Deputy of the LIX Legislature of the Mexican Congress representing Oaxaca as replacement of Jesús Ángel Díaz Ortega.

During his 2013 mayoral campaign, he was involved in a nationwide controversy by producing a fake professional certificate at the main candidates debate. He publicly claimed to be a lawyer, however no evidence was found of his academic records in any university. In 2015, almost two years after he assumed office as mayor of Oaxaca de Juarez, the Secretary of Education released on its website that Villacaña had earned a law degree that very same year at a local college named Centro Educativo de Puebla, him being at least 50 years old by that time.

References

Date of birth unknown
Living people
People from Oaxaca
Members of the Chamber of Deputies (Mexico) for Oaxaca
Institutional Revolutionary Party politicians
Year of birth missing (living people)
Deputies of the LIX Legislature of Mexico